Tatiana Perebiynis and Silvija Talaja were the defending champions, but Perebiynis did not compete this year. Talaja teamed up with Stéphanie Cohen-Aloro and lost in semifinals to tournament winners Nuria Llagostera Vives and Marta Marrero.

Llagostera Vives and Marrero defeated Klaudia Jans and Alicja Rosolska 6–4, 6–3 in the final.

Seeds

Draw

Draw

References
 Main and Qualifying Draws

Orange Warsaw Open
2004 WTA Tour